Savyasachi is a 1995 Indian Kannada-language action drama film directed by M. S. Rajashekar.The movie is based on Kannada novel of same name by Vijay Sasanur. The film stars Shiva Rajkumar and Prema, making her acting debut. The film's soundtrack and score is composed by Sadhu Kokila.

Cast 
 Shiva Rajkumar as Special CBI Agent
Prema as Raadha
 Charithra
 Thoogudeepa Srinivas
 Malathi
 Tej Sapru as Keshwani 
 Avinash as Dr. Delta 
 Shivaram 
 Pruthviraj
 Ravikiran
 H. G. Dattatreya

Soundtrack 
The soundtrack of the film was composed by Sadhu Kokila.

References

External links 

 Thyview of Savyasaachi

1995 films
1990s Kannada-language films
Indian action films
Films based on Indian novels
Films directed by M. S. Rajashekar
1995 action films

kn:ಸವ್ಯಸಾಚಿ